Vera Lewis (June 10, 1873 – February 8, 1956) was an American film and stage actress, beginning in the silent film era. She appeared in more than 180 films between 1915 and 1947. She was married to actor Ralph Lewis.

Biography
She was born in Manhattan, where she began acting in stage productions. Her film career started in 1915 with the film Hypocrites, which starred Myrtle Stedman and Courtenay Foote. From 1915 to 1929 she appeared in 63 silent films, including the film classic Intolerance (1916) where she played the "old maid" Miss Jenkins. 

Unlike many silent film stars, she made a smooth transition to "talking films", starting with her 1930 appearance in Wide Open, starring Patsy Ruth Miller and Edward Everett Horton. Already 56 years old by the time of her first talkie, she appeared in 58 films during the 1930s, and another 60 during the 1940s, almost all of them as a character actress. She retired after 1947, and resided at the Motion Picture Country House in Woodland Hills, California at the time of her death on February 8, 1956.

Family
Vera and Ralph Lewis had a daughter, Monica. During her marriage to Fred Johnson, Monica had four children. Thus in addition to her four grandchildren, Vera and Ralph had 10 great-grandchildren.

Selected filmography

Dot's Elopement (1914, Short) - Dot's Mother
Hypocrites (1915) - Parishioner (uncredited)
The Caprices of Kitty (1915) - Miss Smyth
Sunshine Molly (1915, Short) - Mrs. O'Brien
Betty in Search of a Thrill (1915) - Mrs. Hastings
The Kid Magicians (1915, Short) - Georgie's Mother
Cross Currents (1915) - Mrs. Van de Veer
The Price of Power (1916) - Pauline Belmont - John's Second Wife
The Argonauts of California - 1849 (1916)
Intolerance (1916) - Mary Jenkins
Married by Accident (1917, Short) - Edna's Maid
Jack and the Beanstalk (1917) - The Giantess
Lost in Transit (1917) - Mrs. Flint
The Trouble Buster (1917) - Mrs. Westfall
A Weaver of Dreams (1918) - Aunt Hattie Taylor
A Bit of Jade (1918) - Mrs. Abigail King
The Vigilantes (1918)
The Long Lane's Turning (1919) - Charlotte Allen
As the Sun Went Down (1919) - Ike's Wife
The Lamb and the Lion (1919) - Mrs. Robert Derby
The Pest (1919) - Housekeeper
Yvonne from Paris (1919) - Aunt Marie Provost
The Mother and the Law (1919) - Miss Mary Jenkins
The Merry-Go-Round (1919) - Mrs. Pomeroy
Lombardi, Ltd. (1919) - Mollie
The Blooming Angel (1920) - Floss's Aunt
The Devil's Riddle (1920) - Leading lady
Nurse Marjorie (1920) - Duchess of Donegal
The Poor Simp (1920) - Mrs. Adams
A Full House (1920) - Aunt Penelope
She Couldn't Help It (1920) - Mother Hogan
Nancy from Nowhere (1922) - Mrs. Kelly
Peg o' My Heart (1922) - Mrs. Chichester
 The Glorious Fool (1922) - Miss Hart
Brass (1923) - Mrs. Jones
Desire (1923) - Mrs. De Witt Harlan
The Marriage Market (1923) - Aunt Agnes Piggott
Long Live the King (1923) - Archduchess Annuncita
Innocence (1923) - Wedding Guest (uncredited)
How to Educate a Wife (1924) - Mrs. Bancks
Broadway After Dark (1924) - Mrs. Smith
Cornered (1924) - Mrs. Wells
In Every Woman's Life (1924) - Diana Lansdale
The Dark Swan (1924) - Mrs. Quinn
Who Cares (1925) - Grandmother Ludlow
Eve's Secret (1925) - Duchess
Enticement (1925) - Mrs. Blake
Stella Dallas (1925) - Mrs. Tibbets
The Only Thing (1925) - Princess Erek
The Gilded Butterfly (1926) - Mrs. Ralston
Ella Cinders (1926) - Ma Cinders
The Passionate Quest (1926) - Mrs. Gardner
The Lily (1926) - Mrs. Arnaud Sr
King of the Pack (1926) - 'Widder' Gasper
Take It from Me (1926) - Mrs. Forsythe
The Broken Gate (1927) - Invalid
Resurrection (1927) - Aunt Marya
Thumbs Down (1927) - Mrs. Hale
What Happened to Father? (1927) - Mrs. Bradberry
The Small Bachelor (1927) - Mrs. Waddington
Satan and the Woman (1928) - Mrs. Leone Daingerfield
Something Always Happens (1928) - Gräfin Agathe
Ramona (1928) - Señora Moreno
The Home Towners (1928) - Mrs. Calhoun
The Iron Mask (1929) - Madame Peronne
Coquette (1929) - Miss Jenkins (uncredited)
The Drake Case (1929) - 'Miss' Drake (uncredited)
Wide Open (1930) - Mrs. Hathaway - Agatha's Mother
Strictly Unconventional (1930) - Duchess of Brocklehurst (uncredited)
Just Imagine (1930) - 1980 Census Taker (uncredited)
Command Performance (1931) - Queen Elizabeth
Night Nurse (1931) - Miss Dillon
King Kong (1933) - New York Theatergoer (uncredited)
Hold Your Man (1933) - Mrs. Gargan (uncredited)
My Lips Betray (1933) - Gossipy Woman in Curlers (uncredited)
Meet the Baron (1933) - Head Housekeeper (uncredited)
After Tonight (1933) - Anna Huber, a Cleaner (uncredited)
The Meanest Gal in Town (1934) - Woman at Mayor's Outing (uncredited)
Roaring Roads (1935) - Aunt Harriet
Alias Mary Dow (1935) - Party Guest (uncredited)
The Daring Young Man (1935) - Secretary to the Duchess (uncredited)
Man on the Flying Trapeze (1935) - Mrs. Cordelia Neselrode
Navy Wife (1935) - Bridge Player (uncredited)
Way Down East (1935) - Mrs. Poole
Never Too Late (1935) - Mother Hartley
Paddy O'Day (1936) - Aunt Flora
Don't Get Personal (1936) - Spinster (uncredited)
Dancing Pirate (1936) - Orville's Mother (uncredited)
Missing Girls (1936) - Ma Barton
Maid of Salem (1937) - Townswoman (uncredited)
Nothing Sacred (1937) - Miss Sedgewick (uncredited)
In Old Chicago (1938) - Wedding Witness (uncredited)
Crime School (1938) - Aunt Liz (uncredited)
Little Miss Thoroughbred (1938) - Accident Spectator (uncredited)
Racket Busters (1938) - Jordan's Neighbor (uncredited)
The Amazing Dr. Clitterhouse (1938) - Juror (uncredited)
Mr. Chump (1938) - Mrs. Fletcher (uncredited)
Four Daughters (1938) - Mrs. Ridgefield
Boy Meets Girl (1938) - Studio Cleaning Woman (uncredited)
Broadway Musketeers (1938) - Landlady (uncredited)
The Sisters (1938) - Dowager at Ball (uncredited)
Girls on Probation (1938) - Miss Lewis - Secretary (uncredited)
Nancy Drew... Detective (1938) - Miss Van Deering (uncredited)
Angels with Dirty Faces (1938) - Soapy's Mother (uncredited)
Comet Over Broadway (1938) - Mrs. Appleton
Devil's Island (1939) - Gaudet's Housekeeper (uncredited)
Blackwell's Island (1939) - Hospital Desk Nurse (uncredited)
Torchy Blane in Chinatown (1939) - Dowager (uncredited)
Yes, My Darling Daughter (1939) - Mrs. Dibble (uncredited)
Dodge City (1939) - League Member in Polka-Dot Dress (uncredited)
On Trial (1939) - Mrs. Leeds - Juror #8
Women in the Wind (1939) - Farmer's Wife
Sweepstakes Winner (1939) - Mrs. McCarthy
Naughty but Nice (1939) - Aunt Annabella Hardwick
Hell's Kitchen (1939) - Sarah Krispan
Nancy Drew and the Hidden Staircase (1939) - Miss Rosemary Turnbull
Espionage Agent (1939) - American Tourist Going to Desert (uncredited)
Mr. Smith Goes to Washington (1939) - Mrs. Edwards (uncredited)
The Roaring Twenties (1939) - Mrs. Gray
Kid Nightingale (1939) - Woman Crashing Vase Over Husband's Head (uncredited)
The Return of Doctor X (1939) - Miss Sweetman
Private Detective (1939) - Mrs. Widner
Four Wives (1939) - Mrs. Ridgefield
Granny Get Your Gun (1940) - Carrie
Adventure in Diamonds (1940) - Mrs. MacPherson
The Courageous Dr. Christian (1940) - Mrs. Norma Stewart
An Angel from Texas (1940) - Mrs. Gates (uncredited)
Women in War (1940) - Pierre's Wife (uncredited)
The Man Who Talked Too Much (1940) - Minor Role (scenes deleted)
All This, and Heaven Too (1940) - Queen Amélia of France (uncredited)
They Drive By Night (1940) - Landlady (uncredited)
Money and the Woman (1940) - Mrs. Leslie, First Bank Depositor (uncredited)
Calling All Husbands (1940) - Mrs. McGillicuddy (uncredited)
Always a Bride (1940) - Second Old Maid (scenes deleted)
Father Is a Prince (1940) - Carrie
A Night at Earl Carroll's (1940) - Maidy, Wardrobe Woman (uncredited)
She Couldn't Say No (1940) - Pansy Hawkins
Four Mothers (1941) - Mrs. Ridgefield
Honeymoon for Three (1941) - Book Club Member (uncredited)
Here Comes Happiness (1941) - Mrs. James
Knockout (1941) - Mrs. Turner (scenes deleted)
Model Wife (1941) - Mrs. Leahy (uncredited)
Million Dollar Baby (1941) - (scenes deleted)
Bad Men of Missouri (1941) - Mrs. Jordan (uncredited)
Manpower (1941) - Wife of the Justice of the Peace (uncredited)
The Smiling Ghost (1941) - Mrs. Crockett (uncredited)
Nine Lives Are Not Enough (1941) - Mrs. Slocum
Passage from Hong Kong (1941) - Tourist (uncredited)
One Foot in Heaven (1941) - Mrs. Simpson (uncredited)
Three Girls About Town (1941) - Clubwoman (uncredited)
Miss Polly (1941) - Elvira Pennywinkle
They Died with Their Boots On (1941) - Head Nurse (uncredited)
The Body Disappears (1941) - Mrs. Moggs (uncredited)
Remember the Day (1941) - Teacher (uncredited)
Bullet Scars (1942) - Charles' Wife (uncredited)
Lady Gangster (1942) - Ma Silsby
Larceny, Inc. (1942) - First Customer (uncredited)
Moontide (1942) - Mrs. Simpson (uncredited)
Yankee Doodle Dandy (1942) - Actress (uncredited)
The Gay Sisters (1942) - Courtroom Visitor with Dog (uncredited)
Busses Roar (1942) - Mrs. Dipper
The Hard Way (1943) - Actress as 'Aunt Vera Elliott' in 'Morning Melody' (uncredited)
The Gorilla Man (1943) - Landlady (uncredited)
Someone to Remember (1943) - Aggressive Miss Green
Princess O'Rourke (1943) - Matilda (uncredited)
Mr. Skeffington (1944) - Wife of Justice of the Peace (uncredited)
The Suspect (1944) - Hannah Barlow (uncredited)
The Captain from Köpenick (completed in 1941, released in 1945)
Hollywood and Vine (1945) - Fanny
Rhythm Round-Up (1945) - Mrs. Squimp
Cinderella Jones (1946) - Woman in Courtroom (uncredited)
The Cat Creeps (1946) - Cora Williams
Spook Busters (1946) - Mrs. Grimm
The Killers (1946) - Ma Hirsch (uncredited)
The Time, the Place and the Girl (1946) - Scrubwoman (uncredited)
It's a Joke, Son! (1947) - Hortense Dimwitty
Stallion Road (1947) - Mrs. Pelton, Engagement Party Guest (uncredited)
It Happened on Fifth Avenue (1947) - Woman in Chauffeured Car (uncredited)
It Had to Be You (1947) - Mrs. Brown (scenes deleted)

References

External links

1873 births
1956 deaths
20th-century American actresses
American film actresses
American silent film actresses
Actresses from New York City